Krasnaya Zvezda (literally "Red Star") is the official newspaper of the Soviet and later Russian Ministry of Defence. Today its official designation is "Central Organ of the Russian Ministry of Defence."

Krasnaya Zvezda was created by the decision of the Politburo of the Central Committee of the RCP on 29 November 1923 as the central printing body of the People's Commissariat of defense of the USSR for military Affairs (later the Ministry of Defense of the USSR). The first issue was published on 1 January 1924.

References

External links
Official site
"Krasnaya Zvezda" digital archives in "Newspapers on the web and beyond", the digital resource of the National Library of Russia

Military newspapers published in the Soviet Union
Newspapers established in 1924
Russian-language newspapers published in Russia
1924 establishments in the Soviet Union
State media